Oscar Matías Carniello (born 18 September 1988) is an Argentine professional footballer who plays as a defender for Marsaxlokk.

Career

Club
Carniello's career began with Primera B Nacional club Atlético de Rafaela in 2008, he made 61 appearances and scored 5 goals in his first two seasons with Rafaela. In his third season, 2010–11, Carniello scored 4 goals in 31 games as the club won promotion to the 2011–12 Argentine Primera División. In July 2013, Carniello departed Rafaela to join fellow Primera División side Colón. 17 appearances followed prior to him leaving to sign for Chilean Primera División team Everton. However, he participated in just six matches for Everton before returning to Argentina to join San Martín in 2014 and subsequently won promotion from Primera B Nacional. Two years later, in July 2016, Carniello rejoined Atlético de Rafaela.

Career statistics

Club
.

Honours

Club
Atlético de Rafaela
Primera B Nacional: 2010–11

References

External links
 
 Profile at BDFA 

1988 births
Living people
Argentine footballers
Argentine expatriate footballers
Atlético de Rafaela footballers
Club Atlético Colón footballers
Everton de Viña del Mar footballers
San Martín de San Juan footballers
Boca Unidos footballers
Birkirkara F.C. players
Chilean Primera División players
Argentine Primera División players
Primera Nacional players
Torneo Federal A players
Maltese Premier League players
Association football defenders
Argentine expatriate sportspeople in Chile
Argentine expatriate sportspeople in Malta
Expatriate footballers in Chile
Expatriate footballers in Malta
People from Castellanos Department
Sportspeople from Santa Fe Province